Podgornoye is a rural locality (a selo) and the administrative centre of Chapayevsky Selsoviet, Kugarchinsky District, Bashkortostan, Russia. The population was 566 as of 2010. There are 6 streets.

Geography 
Podgornoye is located 29 km west of Mrakovo (the district's administrative centre) by road. Tlyaumbetovo is the nearest rural locality.

References 

Rural localities in Kugarchinsky District